Solid States is the eighth and final studio album by American alternative rock band The Posies, released on 29 April 2016 by American label MyMusicEmpire.  It was the band's first new album release in six years, and the first since the deaths of drummer Darius Minwalla and bass player Joe Skyward.

The band's first single, "Squirrel vs. Snake," was released as a free download on the 3rd of March 2016, and an extensive month-long European tour promoting the album began on 29 March 2016. The band performed live as a trio with Frankie Siragusa on drums.

Track listing

Personnel
Credits adapted from Discogs
The Posies
Jon Auer 
Ken Stringfellow

Additional musicians
Frankie Siragusa – drums (tracks: 2, 3, 4, 5, 6, 7, 8, 10, 12)
Kliph Scurlock – drums (tracks: 1, 4, 9, 11)
Tiz Aramini – additional vocals (tracks: 2, 4, 12)
Aden Stringfellow –  additional vocals (tracks: 1, 12)
Gizelle Smith – additional vocals  (tracks: 9)
Skylar Gudasz – choir vocals (tracks: 4)
Jeremy Harris – choir vocals (tracks: 4)
Bill McShane – choir vocals (tracks: 4)
Holly Muñoz – choir vocals (tracks: 4)
Todd O'Keefe – choir vocals (tracks: 4)
Ray Venta – choir vocals (tracks: 4)

Production
Producer – Jon Auer, Ken Stringfellow, Colbey Haney, Eddie Grinnell, Frankie Siragusa, Steve Squire
Mixing – Cameron Lister (tracks: 3, 5, 6, 8, 11), Frankie Siragusa (tracks: 2, 10, 12), Tony Hoffer (tracks: 3, 5, 6, 8, 11), Willie Linton (tracks: 1, 7, 9)
Additional Mixing on "Titanic" – Keith Armstrong, Madison Scheckel

Artwork and Design
Artwork, Art Direction – Dominique Stringfellow
Design, Artwork – Elena Titova

References

The Posies albums
2016 albums